A pregnenedione is an unsaturated diketone derivative of a pregnane.

Examples are budesonide and progesterone (pregn-4-ene-3,20-dione).

References

Progestogens